Rabbi Meir Ashkenazi was a Chabad rabbi who served as chief Rabbi of Shanghai from 1926 to 1949.

Early life
Ashkenazi was born to Shneur Zalman and Kayla (Zislin), Chabad Chasidim in Chernihiv. He was taught by his brothers and teachers in his hometown before leaving to study in Lubavitch at the Tomchei Tmimim yeshiva where he studied for a year despite contracting typhoid fever. He received semicha from Rabbi Tzvi Tumarkin and from Rabbi Chaim Soloveitchik, the rabbi of the city and his future father in law. In 1914 he became engaged to Toiba Liba Soloveitchik but the wedding was postponed due to his enlistment in the Russian army during World War I.

Rabbinic positions

Vladivostok
He was appointed as rabbi of Vladivostok. In 1919 his future father in law fled to Harbin in Manchuria due to the spread of communism. He then married his wife in Harbin before returning to Vladivostok where he continued to serve as rabbi until 1926.

Shanghai
In 1926, with the help of Jewish communist youth he had hosted in his home, he received exit visas to leave the Soviet Union for the United States of America. He planned to accept a position in Boston. En route to America he passed through Shanghai, China where Jewish community residents requested that he remain there and be appointed rabbi. Based on the direction of his rabbi, Rabbi Yosef Yitzchak Schneersohn, he accepted the offer and became the chief rabbi of Shanghai.

In 1927 he encouraged the creation of a larger space for the existing Ohel Moshe Synagogue. Today the synagogue is the Shanghai Jewish Refugees Museum where there is an exhibit dedicated to Ashkenazi's life and tenure as chief rabbi. 

In 1934 his parents brought his son Moshe to Israel to study in Yeshivas Toras Emes in Shikun Chabad.

In 1939 Rabbi Ashkenazi helped setup a Talmud Torah for Jewish children. By 1941 it had 120 students and its height had 300 students. He also established a yeshiva ketana headed by his son-in-law, Rabbi Hershel Milner.

During the Holocaust, Ashkenazi assisted the thousands of Jews fleeing the Nazis that arrived in Shanghai as refugees. He also helped arrange weddings for the yeshiva students who became engaged during their time in Shanghai. Ashkenazi also collected funds for the yeshivas as well as being the preferred distribution channel for funds from elsewhere.

In 1949, after the majority of the refugees had left Shanghai and the Jewish community dwindled, Askenazi moved to Crown Heights, Brooklyn.

Death
Ashkenazi died in 1954 and is buried in the Montefiore Cemetery in Queens, New York.

References

Sources
 

1891 births
Jewish Chinese history
Ashkenazi Jewish culture in Asia
Jews and Judaism in Shanghai
Chabad-Lubavitch rabbis
20th-century Russian rabbis
1954 deaths